The Autonomous Front was an electoral alliance formed by the Basque Nationalist Party (PNV), the Socialist Party of the Basque Country (PSE) and Socialists' Unification of the Basque Country (ESEI) to contest the 1977 Spanish Senate election in the Basque Country and Navarre.

Composition

References

1977 establishments in the Basque Country (autonomous community)
1977 disestablishments in Spain
Defunct political party alliances in Spain
Defunct political parties in the Basque Country (autonomous community)
Political parties established in 1977
Political parties disestablished in 1977
Political parties in Navarre